is a Japanese high jumper. He competed  at the 2015 World Championships in Beijing.
 
His personal bests in the event are 2.28 metres outdoors (Yokohama 2015) and 2.17 metres indoors (Gothenburg 2015).

Competition record

References

Japanese male high jumpers
Living people
Place of birth missing (living people)
1997 births
World Athletics Championships athletes for Japan
Athletes (track and field) at the 2014 Summer Youth Olympics
Competitors at the 2015 Summer Universiade
21st-century Japanese people